Máximo Laura Taboada (born 1959 in Ayacucho) is a Peruvian tapestry weaver.

Laura is recognized as one of South America's pre-eminent textile artists. Laura is known for tapestries that intertwine Peruvian tradition with contemporary aesthetics.  He is also known for creating the contemporary tapestry movement in Peru, promoting Peruvian textiles around the world with 160 exhibits, in more than 40 countries.

Laura is the fifth generation of weavers in his family, learning the trade from his father while growing up in Ayacucho. Laura now lives in Lima. Laura draws inspiration from Chavin culture, Paracas culture, Nazca and Wari culture.

Laura is a co-founder of Iberoamerican Textile Network and the Peruvian Center of Textile Art. He is also a member of the American Tapestry Alliance, the European Tapestry Network and the British Tapestry Group.

In 2010, Laura won the Award of "National Living Human Treasure" of Peru. In 2013, Laura opened the Museo Maximo Laura in Cusco, Peru, which houses the largest collection of his work.

References

External links
http://www.dailymotion.com/video/x198j3y_los-tapices-de-maximo-laura-y-su-pasion-por-el-color_news
http://www.peruthisweek.com/blogs-museo-maximo-laura-opens-in-cusco-102214
 www.maximolaura.com
 www.museomaximolaura.com

1959 births
Living people
Peruvian weavers
National University of San Marcos alumni
Peruvian textile artists